Frits M. de los Santos Goedgedrag (born 1 November 1951 in Aruba) is a Dutch Antillean politician who was the first governor of Curaçao following the dissolution of the Netherlands Antilles. During his tenure, he oversaw the dissolution of the Netherlands Antilles and Curaçao becoming a constituent country within the Kingdom of the Netherlands.

Career 
From 1992 to 1998, Goedgedrag was lieutenant governor of Bonaire. GHe succeeded Jaime Saleh in 2010 to become the governor of the Netherlands Antilles and remained in this post until the dissolution of the Antilles in 2003. H refused to name the 2003 Curaçao general election party leader as formateur, citing a criminal investigation. Goedgedrag instead appointed Mirna Louisa-Godett as formateur. In September 2012, Goedgedrag resigned his commission citing health reasons. At his farewell ceremony he was knighted as a Commander in the Order of Orange-Nassau. 

In May 2013, Goedgedrag was appointed to the Council of State for extraordinary service to the special municipalities of Bonaire, St. Eustatius and Saba. In June 2013,he was appointed to the Council of Advice of Aruba. In 2014, he was appointed chairman of the Council of Advice. His term ended in July 2020.

References

1951 births
Aruban politicians
Living people
Governors of Curaçao
Lieutenant Governors of Bonaire
Governors of the Netherlands Antilles